The 2021 Welsh Open (officially the 2021 BetVictor Welsh Open) was a professional snooker tournament that took place from 15 to 21 February 2021 at the Celtic Manor Resort in Newport, Wales. It was the 10th ranking event of the 2020–21 snooker season and the 30th edition of the Welsh Open, first held in 1992. It was the fifth of six tournaments in the European Series and the fourth and final event of the Home Nations Series. The event was sponsored by sports betting company BetVictor, with the winner being awarded £70,000 from a total prize fund of £405,000.

Shaun Murphy was the defending champion, having won the 2020 event with a 9–1 victory over Kyren Wilson in the final. However, Murphy lost 5–4 to Stephen Maguire in the quarter-finals. Jordan Brown defeated Ronnie O'Sullivan 9–8 in the final to win the first ranking title of his career. Ranked 81st in the world, Brown became the lowest-ranked player to win a ranking event since world number 93 Dave Harold won the 1993 Asian Open.

Format
The Welsh Open began as a ranking tournament in 1992.
The 2021 tournament took place at the Celtic Manor Resort in Newport between 15 and 21 February, the thirtieth edition of the event. It was the tenth World Snooker Tour ranking competition in the 2020-21 snooker season, following the Snooker Shoot Out and preceding the 2021 Players Championship. It was the fifth of six events in the BetVictor European Series and the fourth and final event of the Home Nations Series.

The defending Welsh Open champion from 2020 was Shaun Murphy who won the final with a 9–1 victory over Kyren Wilson. All matches were best-of-seven  until the quarter-finals, which were the best-of-nine, the semi-finals the best-of-eleven. The final was played over two , as the best-of-17 frames. The event was sponsored by sports betting company BetVictor, and broadcast locally by BBC Cymru Wales. It was also broadcast by Quest in the United Kingdom; Eurosport in Europe; CCTV5, Youku, Zhibo.tv and Migu in China; Now TV in Hong Kong; True Sport in Thailand; Sky Sports in New Zealand; DAZN in Canada; and Astrosport in Malaysia. In all other locations it was broadcast by Matchroom Sport.

Prize fund
The event's total prize fund was £405,000, with the winner receiving £70,000. The player accumulating the highest amount of prize money over the six events received a bonus of £150,000. The breakdown of prize money is shown below:

 Winner: £70,000
 Runner-up: £30,000
 Semi-final: £20,000
 Quarter-final: £10,000
 Last 16: £7,500
 Last 32: £4,000
 Last 64: £3,000
 Highest break: £5,000
 Total: £405,000

Summary

Early rounds
The first two rounds of the competition were played between 15 and 17 February, with rounds three and four on 18 February. Defending champion Shaun Murphy was 20th in the one year ranking event, and required to gain four places to play in the next event, the Players Championship. Murphy reached the last 16 with wins over Zak Surety, Stuart Carrington, Ryan Day and Stuart Bingham. World number one Judd Trump defeated Chinese players Zhao Jianbo and Si Jiahui but lost in the third round to Iranian player Hossein Vafaei 2–4.

Two-time winner Mark Williams defeated Michael White 4–1 in the first round, with an average shot time of only 15 seconds. Williams later commented that "I’m going to play as fast as I can and get in and out as quick as I can. I’m actually going to see if I can get one match down as quick as ten seconds a shot. That’s my goal for the rest of the season." Williams defeated Liam Highfield, Joe Perry and Vafaei to reach the quarter-finals. Selby then defeated Jamie O'Neill, Joe O'Connor and Masters champion Yan Bingtao to reach the quarter-finals. Jordan Brown defeated Luo Honghao, Sam Craigie and Alexander Ursenbacher before beating Mark King 4–3 to reach his second ranking quarter-final of his career.

Ali Carter defeated Daniel Wells and Aaron Hill before beating both John Higgins and Mark Allen to reach the quarter-finals. Ronnie O'Sullivan lost only one frame in his first four matches to reach the quarter-finals, whitewashing three players. Eighth seed Stephen Maguire defeated two Welshmen in Dominic Dale and Matthew Stevens before beating Matthew Selt and Pang Junxu to reach the last eight.

Quarter-finals–final

The quarter-finals were played as the best-of-9 frames matches on 19 February. Ali Carter withdrew from the event shortly before his match against Ronnie O'Sullivan due to health concerns. Murphy, the defending champion, was defeated 4–5 by Maguire. He made breaks of 105, 84, 55, 90 and 133 to defeat Murphy. In losing the match, Murphy was unable to qualify for the Players Championship, finishing 17th in the one-year rankings. Playing in the second ranking quarter-final of his career, Jordan Brown met Mark Selby. The match lasted three hours and 48 minutes and with the scores tied at 4–4, Selby missed the final  into the centre pocket, which Brown potted to win the match. Mark Williams defeated Tom Ford 5–4 in the final quarter-final match which decided which of the two players would qualify for the Players Championship.

The semi-finals were played as the best-of-11 frame matches on 20 February. Williams took the opening frame in his match against O'Sullivan, before his opponent won the next six successive frames. O'Sullivan commented "I knew he was playing well and scoring well. I had to be on my guard. I played pretty solidly." The other semi-final was played between Jordan Brown and Steven Maguire. Brown made a break of 135 in the opening frame, before Maguire tied the scores at 1–1. Brown then made breaks of 56, 113 and 59 winning the next five frames to take the match 6–1. Brown commented "Three years ago I was working in a petrol station and serving customers... To be in a ranking tournament final is just incredible".

The final was played as the best-of-17 frames held over two . Brown was playing in his first ranking event final; whilst his opponent O'Sullivan was playing in his 56th. Brown took the first two frames of the match before O'Sullivan won frame three. Brown won frame four with a break of 78 and led 4–1 after a century break. The next two frames were won by O'Sullivan, however, Brown took the next frame to lead 5–3 after the first session. After the break, O'Sullivan won the next three frames to take the lead, but Brown leveled the match in frame 12 to 6–6, and level again at 7–7. Brown made a break of 56 to lead 8–7. The match was taken into a  after a break of 119 by O'Sullivan. Brown won the match 9–8 after a break of 74. Ranked 81st in the world, Brown became the lowest-ranked player to win a ranking event since world number 93 Dave Harold won the 1993 Asian Open. He also became the first Northern Irish player to win a Welsh Open title.

Tournament draw
Below is the main draw for the event. Numbers in brackets denote seeded players. Players in bold denote match winners.

Top half

Section 1

Section 2

Section 3

Section 4

Bottom half

Section 5

Section 6

Section 7

Section 8

Finals

Final

Century breaks
There were 72 century breaks made during the event. The highest was a 143 made by Zhao Xintong in frame three of his first round win over Luca Brecel.

 143  Zhao Xintong
 141  Ryan Day
 138, 135, 122, 121, 119, 102  Ronnie O'Sullivan
 138, 124, 107, 101  Barry Hawkins
 135, 113, 107, 105  Jordan Brown
 134, 131, 128, 109  Mark Selby
 134, 123, 101  Scott Donaldson
 133, 119, 107, 103  Shaun Murphy
 133, 105, 105, 104, 100  Stephen Maguire
 133  Matthew Selt
 132, 126, 123, 118, 101  Zhou Yuelong
 130, 124, 101  John Higgins
 130, 106  Graeme Dott
 130  Billy Castle
 128  Martin Gould
 127, 114, 113, 104  Yan Bingtao
 124  Stuart Bingham
 121  Joe O'Connor
 121  Xiao Guodong
 120  Jack Lisowski
 120  Thepchaiya Un-Nooh
 117  Judd Trump
 114, 101  Anthony McGill
 114  Si Jiahui
 113  Fraser Patrick
 110  Pang Junxu
 109  Hossein Vafaei
 107  Soheil Vahedi
 106  Igor Figueiredo
 106  Ricky Walden
 103  Ali Carter
 103  Kyren Wilson
 102  Ding Junhui
 102  Andrew Higginson
 101, 101  David Gilbert
 100  Jamie Jones
 100  Lei Peifan

References

Home Nations Series
2021
2021 in snooker
2021 in Welsh sport
February 2021 sports events in the United Kingdom
2021
European Series